The Croatia women's national futsal team represents Croatia during international futsal competitions and is controlled by the Croatian Football Federation and represents the country in women's international futsal competitions, such as the European Championships.

Results

UEFA European Women's Futsal Championship

Players

Current squad 
Squad for 2022 qualifiers

Record against other teams 
As of 21 December 2021

Biggest Wins

Biggest Losses

References

External links 

 CROfutsal 
 HRfutsal.com 
 HNS-CFF 

 
European women's national futsal teams
national